Rafael Sánchez Pérez (24 October 1944 – 25 June 2008) was a Mexican politician affiliated with the National Action Party. He served as Deputy of the LXIX, LVII and LIX Legislatures of the Mexican Congress as a plurinominal representative.

References

1944 births
2008 deaths
Politicians from Jalisco
Members of the Chamber of Deputies (Mexico)
National Action Party (Mexico) politicians
Deputies of the LIX Legislature of Mexico